Anth is a nickname. People with this name include the following:

Anth Lormor, nickname for Anthony Lormor who is also known as Tony Lormor, (born 1970) English footballer
Anth Smith, nickname for Anthony Smith, (born 1971), English footballer

See also

Ant (name)
Ante (name)
Anto (name)
Ants (given name)